The Receiving End of Sirens was an American rock band from Belchertown, Massachusetts, United States. Formed in 2003, the band broke up in 2008 then briefly reunited in 2010. On February 18, 2020, the band announced a brief reunion tour.

Overview
The band played on the 2005 Warped Tour and has toured with such acts as Gatsbys American Dream, A Wilhelm Scream, Thirty Seconds to Mars, Funeral for a Friend, Saves the Day, Senses Fail, Thrice, and New Found Glory. The band's first headlining tour, "The New Hope Tour," began on March 31, 2006. About a week before the start of the tour, guitarist/vocalist Alex fell down a flight of stairs, breaking his scapula, two ribs and puncturing his lung. A question of whether or not he would be able to perform arose, yet he pulled through. Some of the bands who supported The Receiving End of Sirens on their first headlining tour were As Tall as Lions, A Thorn for Every Heart, Hit the Lights and I Am the Avalanche.

On March 18, 2008 the band announced that it would "no longer exist in the way it has for the past 5 years" on their MySpace page. The main reason for the breakup was the fact that Brendan had a child in January, and he decided he needed to reassess his priorities. In a MySpace bulletin he claimed that all of the members still keep a passion for music and the love for their fans. The band played two of their last three last shows at Lupo's in Providence, Rhode Island on May 2, supported by Envy on the Coast and Therefore I Am, and The Bamboozle Festival in East Rutherford, New Jersey on May 4. On May 5, a final farewell was performed under the pseudonym The Red Eye of Soromon at Harper's Ferry in Allston, Massachusetts.

Name
According to drummer Andrew Cook:
"I was a cook at a place called McCarthy's Pub in Massachusetts.  A bunch of police cars and ambulances went screaming by and the name popped in my head.  Like, thinking about how people never really think what's 'on the receiving end of sirens,' because its such a common thing just to hear the sirens.  Especially if you live in a city, it just becomes this commonplace thing, nobody thinks twice about it anymore.  Even though there's so much awful stuff going on in the world, and horrible things that happen to people, it's kind of like 'out of sight, out of mind.'  It's just kind of a sad thing.  So it's kind of a commentary on that.  It also works on a couple levels.  It can be taken as the Greek mythology example with the Sirens that lure sailors in with their singing, so being on the receiving end of those sirens isn't a great thing.  It works both ways."

The band has also been known to perform under the pseudonym The Red Eye of Soromon , or, if abbreviated, TREOS. Andrew explained the name change in an interview for www.drivenfaroff.com:
"Sometimes we just feel like playing a show near home and not announcing it as a TREOS show, just keeping it small and intimate and stuff. And you know, when you play a lot of shows you have to worry about your draw, and a lot of bands will purposefully not play their hometown area for a long time to build up a draw. It’s something that every band needs to be conscious of. And for us, we got to thinking, “We haven’t played a show in Massachusetts for a long time, kind of purposefully “we need to give ourselves a break and not saturate the market so people don’t care about seeing us anymore,” you know? And it got to the point where like, “Man, we miss playing hall shows and stuff. Let’s just do one,” and we talked to Alex from Therefore I Am because we love those guys and love playing with them, and worked it out. He set up the show and it just worked out great. People have caught on and every time they see The Red Eye of Soromon they’re obviously going to know it’s us, but it’s just something to do to be fun, you know, just be goofy about it, show people that we don’t take ourselves too seriously and that we still love playing shows like this. Playing big shows is great, playing big clubs is great, but it loses something at that level, you know? And it’s not as intimate and off-the-cuff and random as shows like these, and we love doing it, so we’re going to keep doing it as long as we’re a band, regardless of how well or how poorly the band does from here on out." The most recent performance under the pseudonym was on May 16, 2012.

History

Formation and EP (2003–2004)
The band formed in 2003, and their original lineup consisted of Brendan Brown, Alex Bars, Andrew Cook, Nate Patterson, and Ben Potrykus, formerly of Massachusetts pop-punk band Fake-ID.  With this lineup they recorded two demos with a total of five songs, including two versions of "The Race", and gained a following throughout New England.  After a conflict of interest involving the future of the band and their signing with a record label, Ben left the band.  They played their last show with this lineup on November 8, 2003 in Fitchburg, Massachusetts.

After almost 6 months on hiatus the band came back to life with their new member Casey Crescenzo.  They played their first show with the new lineup on April 20, 2004 in Amherst, Massachusetts.  Their new lineup featured three-tiered vocals split by Crescenzo, Bars, and Brown, and the addition of keyboards and synth.  At this time they also released their self-titled five-song EP.

Between the Heart and the Synapse (2005–2006)
In April 2005 their full-length album Between the Heart and the Synapse was released.

After a year of touring, Casey Crescenzo left the band in May 2006 and started pursuing his side project, The Dear Hunter, full-time.  After Crescenzo's departure, long-time friend of the band Ross filled in on guitar during their tour with Circa Survive and most notably at radio station WFNX "Disorientation" free concert in Boston featuring TREOS and Taking Back Sunday.

On November 6, 2006, the band announced their new permanent member as Brian Southall (formerly the drummer of Boys Night Out). He plays guitar, keys, and backup vocals.

The Earth Sings Mi Fa Mi and break up (2007–2009)
Their second album The Earth Sings Mi Fa Mi was released on August 7, 2007. The band had arranged to stream a live concert from Vintage Vinyl Record Store in New Jersey on the new real-time entertainment site www.Yebotv.com on August 9, 2007.

On March 18, 2008, Brendan Brown announced via a MySpace bulletin that because of his new priorities (having a baby), the band is coming to an end.

On Friday May 2, 2008 the band played its farewell show with Envy on the Coast and Therefore I Am. Casey Crescenzo made a return halfway through the set. TREOS performed virtually all of their tracks, forcing them to repeat Planning a Prison Break as their encore. They headlined in Providence, Rhode Island. Absolute Punk wrote that "They played 21 songs (technically 22 because the crowd got them to play "Planning a Prison Break" twice) – almost every track spanning their three CD discography."

The band also played The Bamboozle on May 4, 2008 and performed their final show as The Red Eye of Soromon in Allston, MA on May 5, 2008, where they played all of Between the Heart and the Synapse in order from start to finish, with Casey, followed by an encore set.

The band recorded their farewell show at Lupo's on May 2, 2008, however, there has been no announcement stating a release date. Along with concert footage, the DVD will contain never-before-seen interviews, as well as backstage footage from many of the band's tours. The live concert footage will span twenty-two songs and will feature Casey Crescenzo for the latter half of the performance.

After the breakup of The Receiving End of Sirens Brian Southall begun working on a new project titled The Company We Keep.

On November 25, 2008, the band posted a video of "Planning a Prison Break" live from their May 2 show.  This hints that a DVD may be officially announced in the near future. On June 6, 2009, the first news pointing towards a closer release date was found at absolutepunk, where TREOS asked for fans to send in pictures of them with the band. The rumors of a DVD were confirmed when the latest video was posted on the official Skatefest website, in which members of TREOS discuss the DVD.

Reunion (2009–present)
On December 22, 2009, Brian Southall confirmed that TREOS would be reuniting to play Skate Fest 2010 in Worcester, MA.  The Skate Fest web page was updated with a previously unreleased video of "The War of All Against All" from the farewell show in Providence.  Casey Crescenzo confirmed that he would once again be joining the band on stage at Skate Fest.

The band played one more show before Skatefest at Jerky's in Providence, RI. The flyer for the show read "The Real Eve Of Skatefest"(a backronym for TREOS) and included the bands Envy on the Coast, All the Day Holiday, Lions Lions, and a special unannounced guest.

In late 2010, several members of the band began hinting that they were recording new songs, via Twitter.  Brian Southall, Brendan Brown, Andrew Cook and Nate Patterson have all replied to each other's tweets, often capitalizing the letters "T-R-E-O-S" in each tweet, such as Southall's post, "tracking guitars, This Really Epic Original Song i wrote with some friends a few months ago."

Triple Crowns Records later confirmed that they will be re-releasing Between the Heart and the Synapse as a double LP along with a new song by the band and live videos. The members have been taking time off from their current projects to write and record the new song for the release.  John D, creator of The Bamboozle Festival, announced that they will be playing the 2012 festival on Friday, May 18 in Asbury Park, New Jersey for the festival's 10th anniversary.

TREOS (under the pseudonym "The Red Eye of Soromon") played The Middle East night club in Cambridge, MA on May 16, 2012.

On February 17, 2020, the band's official Twitter page announced a tour with Envy on the Coast. The tour would later be called off due to the COVID-19 pandemic.

Andrew Cook is currently a full-time touring drummer for country act Dan + Shay.

Band members

Current members
 Brendan Brown – lead & backing vocals, bass (2003–2008, 2010–2012, 2020-present)
 Alex Bars – lead & backing vocals, rhythm guitar  (2003–2008, 2010–2012, 2020-present)
 Nate Patterson – lead guitar, keyboard  (2003–2008, 2010–2012, 2020-present)
 Andrew Cook – drums, programming  (2003–2008, 2010–2012, 2020-present)
 Casey Crescenzo – lead & backing vocals, rhythm and lead guitar, keyboard, programming, screamed vocals (2004–2006, 2010–2012, 2020-present)
 Brian Southall – rhythm and lead guitar, keyboard, percussion, backing vocals (2006–2008, 2010-2012, 2020-present)

Past members
 Ben Potrykus – lead vocals (2003)

Timeline

Discography

Videography
"Planning a Prison Break" (2005)
"This Armistice" (2006)
"The Evidence" (2007)
"Smoke & Mirrors" (2007)

References

External links
 The Company We Keep interview with Audio Addiction Magazine
 Photos and review from a TREOS set on Monday July 7, 2003 at TT the Bears in Cambridge, MA

Rock music groups from Massachusetts
Springfield
American post-hardcore musical groups
Musical groups established in 2003
Musical groups disestablished in 2008
Musical groups reestablished in 2010
Musical groups disestablished in 2015
Musical groups reestablished in 2020
Triple Crown Records artists